The 1977 Southern Cross Rally, officially the Total Oil Southern Cross International Rally was the twelfth running of the Southern Cross Rally and the sixteenth round of the 1977 FIA Cup for Rally Drivers. The rally took place between the 8th and the 13th of October 1977. The event covered 2,683 kilometres from Sydney to Port Macquarie.  It was won by Rauno Aaltonen and Jeff Beaumont, driving a Datsun 710 SSS.

Results

References

Rally competitions in Australia
Southern Cross Rally
Southern Cross Rally